Isadelphina is a genus of moths of the family Erebidae. The genus was erected by George Hampson in 1926.

Species
Some species of this genus are:
Isadelphina albistellataHampson, 1926
Isadelphina cheilosema Hampson, 1926
Isadelphina griseifascia Gaede, 1940
Isadelphina lacteifascia Hampson, 1926
Isadelphina mariaeclarae Kiriakoff, 1954
Isadelphina retracta (Hampson, 1910)
Isadelphina rufaria Hampson, 1926
Isadelphina vinacea (Hampson, 1902)
Isadelphina xylochroa Hampson, 1926

References

Hampson, G. F. (1926). Descriptions of New Genera and Species of Lepidoptera Phalaenae of the Subfamily Noctuinae (Noctuidae) in the British Museum (Natural History).

Calpinae